In Wrong' Wright is a 1920 American silent Western film directed by Albert Russell and starring Hoot Gibson.

Cast
 Hoot Gibson
 Dorothy Wood
 Harry Jackson
 Charles Herzinger credited as C.W. Herzinger
 Tom London credited as Leonard Clapham
 Jim Corey

See also
 Hoot Gibson filmography

References

External links
 

1920 films
1920 short films
1920 Western (genre) films
American silent short films
American black-and-white films
Films directed by Albert Russell
Silent American Western (genre) films
1920s American films
1920s English-language films